Mike Callan (born ) is a former professional rugby league footballer who played in the 1990s and 2000s.

References

External links
Statistics at wolvesplayers.thisiswarrington.co.uk
Bragging rights at stake as rivals battle for Law Cup

1983 births
Blackpool Panthers players
English rugby league players
Leigh Leopards players
Living people
Oldham R.L.F.C. players
Place of birth missing (living people)
Rochdale Hornets players
Rugby league props
Rugby league second-rows
Warrington Wolves players